The Tempoku Line (天北線 Tempoku-sen) was a railway line most recently operated by Hokkaido Railway Company (JR Hokkaido) in Hokkaidō, Japan. The 148.9 kilometres line connected from Otoineppu to 
Minami-Wakkanai via Nakatonbetsu, Hamatonbetsu and Sarufutsu until its closure in 1989. This railway line was named after Teshio Province and Kitami Province.

History 
The first section from Otoineppu to Shō-Tombetsu was opened in 1914. All section was opened in 1922, as the first railway line for Wakkanai. In 1926, Teshio line via Horonobe was opened. From Otoineppu to Wakkanai, the distance of this line  was longer than Teshio line. In 1930, Teshio line was integrated into Sōya Main Line, and this line was separated from it and renamed Kitami line.
In 1961, Kitami line was renamed to Tempoku line. In 1987, JNR was privatized, and this line was inherited by JR Hokkaido, but abandoned on 1 May 1989.

Stations

After discontinuing
Soya Bus (Belong to Tokyu Group until 1999) have altered the Tenpoku Line since 1989. But the altered line was partly discontinued in 2011.

See also
Sōya Main Line

References

Defunct railroads
1067 mm gauge railways in Japan